Starkfield can refer to:

Starkfield, a fictional Massachusetts city in the novel Ethan Frome
Stark Field, professional-size baseball field located in El Centro, California
StarkField, a french player on PC and PS4.